Irmgard Abs-Wurmbach (December 19, 1938 – April 8, 2020) was a German mineralogist and the mineral Abswurmbachite is named after her.  She was professor at the Technical University of Berlin.

Life 
She was professor for applied mineralogy at the TU Berlin since 1991. Previously, she taught and researched at the University of Bonn, Ruhr-University Bochum, University of Bern and Philipps-University Marburg. She did research in the field of absorption, electron spin resonance and Mößbauer spectroscopy.

Awards 
The mineral Abswurmbachite is named after her.

References 

German mineralogists
Academic staff of the Technical University of Berlin
University of Bonn alumni
1938 births
2020 deaths